The People of Småland (Swedish: Smålänningar) is a 1935 Swedish comedy film directed by Gösta Rodin and starring Sigurd Wallén, Sture Lagerwall and Sickan Carlsson. It was shot at the Råsunda Studios in Stockholm. The film's sets were designed by the art director Arne Åkermark.

Cast
 Sigurd Wallén as 	Gustav Adolf Söderlund
 Sture Lagerwall as Gustav Söderlund
 Sickan Carlsson as 	Inga Blomgren
 Thor Modéen as 	Napoleon Olsson
 Eric Abrahamsson as 	Blomgren
 Torsten Winge as 	Berggren
 Hjalmar Peters as 	Johan Johansson
 Nils Jacobsson as 	Gille
 Bror Olsson as 	August Söderlund
 Emmy Albiin as 	Anna Söderlund
 Julia Cæsar as Vackra Olga
 Wiktor Andersson as 	Hotel clerk at Hotell Småland 
 Johnny Bode as 	Musician
 Ernst Brunman as 	Kalle Broberg, ticket collector 
 Artur Cederborgh as 	Ludvig Danielsson 
 Emil Fjellström as 	Man on the street in Värnamo 
 Hartwig Fock as Shop assistant in hat store 
 Sune Holmqvist as 	Young man 
 Nils Hultgren as 	Janitor at Blomgren's office 
 Sven Jerring as 	Self 
 Helge Kihlberg as 	Customer 
 Eivin Lagergren as	Musician 
 Nils Larson as 	Musician 
 Wilma Malmlöf as 	Woman
 Harry Essing as 	Man 
 Erik Forslund as 	Man
 Richard Lindström as Clerk at Lindström & Co. 
 Olav Riégo as 	Johansson 
 Tom Walter as Man at the market
 Ruth Weijden as 	Inga's aunt

References

Bibliography 
 Wallengren, Ann-Kristin.  Welcome Home Mr Swanson: Swedish Emigrants and Swedishness on Film. Nordic Academic Press, 2014.

External links 
 

1935 films
1935 comedy films
Swedish comedy films
1930s Swedish-language films
Swedish black-and-white films
Films directed by Gösta Rodin
1930s Swedish films